Your Face Sounds Familiar is a Greek reality show airing on ANT1. The seventh season, known also as Your Face Sounds Familiar – All Star, premiered on February 21, 2021 and featured ten contestants from the previous seasons, as the all stars.

After the cancellation of the previous edition because of the coronavirus pandemic in Greece, it was rumored that the sixth season will continue in September 2020. In October 2020, it was announced that the show will return on 2021, with the new contestants being ten stars from the previous editions.

Cast

Host and judges
Maria Bekatorou returned to host the show for the seventh time and the judging panel changed from the previous edition. The new judging panel consists of Katerina Papoutsaki (who served as judge in season 3), Takis Zacharatos (who served as judge in season 2), Michalis Reppas and Kostis Maravegias.

Contestants
Ten contestants in total competed in the seventh season; four women and six men. All contestants have participated in previous seasons of YFSF:

On March 5, 2021, Costas Doxas announced his withdrawal from the season, due to a post by his ex-wife, which states that he abused her. Costas Doxas reported that the post and the statements of his ex-wife are unfounded.

Voting 
The jury voting slightly changed compared to other seasons. The traditional voting (3, 4, 5, 6, 7, 8, 9, 10, 11, 12) changed and the jury now awards 2 sets of 7 points, 2 sets of 8 points, 2 sets of 9, 2 sets of 10, a set of 11 points and a set of 12 points.

Due to the restrictions, social distances and the ongoing lockdown in Greece, there is no live audience. While there is no audience in the studio, the audience watches the live show through Zoom and votes from there for their favorite contestant.

Weekly results

Week 1
The premiere aired on February 28, 2021, and the winner was Costas with 20 points. Costas chose to give the money from the audience voting to the organization "Training & Rehabilitation Center for the Blind People".

After the judges and contestants' scores, Ian and Costas were tied with 37 points and Thanasis and Betty were tied with 33 points. Papoutsaki, who was the president of the judges for the week, chose to give the final 9 points to Ian and the 8 points to Costas and chose to give the 4 points to Thanasis and the 3 points to Betty. After the combined final scores, two contestants had 20 points, other two contestants had 13 points and other two contestants had 12 points. The one who got the highest score from the audience got the highest final place and the one with the lowest got the lowest place.

Notes
 1.  The points that judges gave in order (Zacharatos, Papoutsaki, Maraveyas, Reppas).
 2.  Each contestant gave 5 points to a contestant of their choice.
 3.  Total of both extra and judges' score.
 4.  Result of both extra and judges' score.

Week 2
The second episode aired on March 7, 2021, and the winner was Katerina with 23 points. Katerina chose to give the money from the audience voting to the organization "Paidiko Chorio SOS" (Children's Village SOS).

Due to Costas' withdrawal, Ian (who was going to perform as Natassa Theodoridou) didn't participate in this episode, due to a duet with Costas' character (who was going to perform as Triantaphillos). Also, due to the show being pre-recorded, the points of Costas didn't counted and showed during the live show, instead of Ian's where didn't showed during the live show but counted normally.

After the judges and contestants' scores, Thanasis and Tania were tied with 35 points. Zacharatos, who was the president of the judges for the week, chose to give the final 7 points to Thanasis and the 6 points to Tania. After the combined final scores, two contestants had 16 points. The one who got the highest score from the audience got the highest final place and the one with the lowest got the lowest place.

Notes
 5.  The points that judges gave in order (Zacharatos, Papoutsaki, Maraveyas, Reppas).
 6.  Each contestant gave 5 points to a contestant of their choice.
 7.  Total of both extra and judges' score.
 8.  Result of both extra and judges' score.

Week 3
The third episode aired on March 14, 2021, and the winner was Thanasis with 23 points. Thanasis chose to give the money from the audience voting to the organization "KEPEA Orizontes".

After the judges and contestants' scores, Betty and Lefteris were tied with 33 points. Maraveyas, who was the president of the judges for the week, chose to give the final 6 points to Betty and the 5 points to Lefteris. After the combined final scores, two contestants had 20 points and two contestants had 11 points. The one who got the highest score from the audience got the highest final place and the one with the lowest got the lowest place.

Notes
 1.  The points that judges gave in order (Zacharatos, Papoutsaki, Maraveyas, Reppas).
 2.  Each contestant gave 5 points to a contestant of their choice.
 3.  Total of both extra and judges' score.
 4.  Result of both extra and judges' score.

Week 4: Best Previous Appearance Night
The fourth episode aired on March 21, 2021, and the winner was Tania with 22 points. Tania chose to give the money from the audience voting to the organization "Ena Oniro, Mia Efhi".

After the judges and contestants' scores, Katerina and Krateros were tied with 32 points. Reppas, who was the president of the judges for the week, chose to give the final 6 points to Katerina and the 5 points to Krateros. After the combined final scores, two contestants had 21 points and two contestants had 12 points. The one who got the highest score from the audience got the highest final place and the one with the lowest got the lowest place.

Notes
 1.  The points that judges gave in order (Zacharatos, Papoutsaki, Maraveyas, Reppas).
 2.  Each contestant gave 5 points to a contestant of their choice.
 3.  Total of both extra and judges' score.
 4.  Result of both extra and judges' score.

Week 5
The fifth episode aired on March 28, 2021, and the winner was Isaias with 23 points. Isaias chose to give the money from the audience voting to the organization "Protipo Ethniko Nipiotrofio of Kallithea".

After the judges and contestants' scores, Matthildi and Lefteris were tied with 44 points, Ian and Tania were tied with 33 points and Katerina and Thanasis were tied with 32 points. Papoutsaki, who was the president of the judges for the week, chose to give the final 10 points to Matthildi and the 9 points to Lefteris, the final 8 points to Tania and 7 points to Ian and the 6 points to Katerina and the 5 points to Thanasis. After the combined final scores, two contestants had 18 points. The one who got the highest score from the audience got the highest final place and the one with the lowest got the lowest place.

The Secret Guests of the evening were the members of the boy band One who helped Ian with his transformation and Melina Makri, who transformed into Themis Adamadidis and sang "Ma Pou Na Pao" as an interval act.

Notes
 1.  The points that judges gave in order (Zacharatos, Papoutsaki, Maraveyas, Reppas).
 2.  Each contestant gave 5 points to a contestant of their choice.
 3.  Total of both extra and judges' score.
 4.  Result of both extra and judges' score.

Week 6
The sixth episode aired on April 18, 2021, and the winner was Matthildi with 22 points. Matthildi chose to give the money from the audience voting to the organization "Syndesmo Prostasias Paidion & AmEA". The sixth live was to be aired on April 2, 2021, and later on April 11, 2021, but a case of coronavirus was detected among the people of production.

After the judges and contestants' scores, Katerina and Krateros were tied with 30 points. Zacharatos, who was the president of the judges for the week, chose to give the final 7 points to Katerina and the 6 points to Krateros. After the combined final scores, two contestants had 22 points and other three contestants had 14 points. The one who got the highest score from the audience got the highest final place and the one with the lowest got the lowest place.

The Secret Guest of the evening was Dimos Beke, who transformed into Ilias Psinakis and sang "Tora Arhizoun Ta Diskola", "Den Ehi Sidera I Kardia Sou" and "Ola Kala".

Lefteris Eleftheriou didn't participate to the sixth live.

Notes
 1.  The points that judges gave in order (Zacharatos, Papoutsaki, Maraveyas, Reppas).
 2.  Each contestant gave 5 points to a contestant of their choice.
 3.  Total of both extra and judges' score.
 4.  Result of both extra and judges' score.

Week 7
The seventh episode will be aired on April 25, 2021, and the winner was Krateros with 23 points. Krateros chose to give the money from the audience voting to the organization "ELEPAP".

After the judges and contestants' scores, Katerina and Tania were tied with 36 points. Maravegias, who was the president of the judges for the week, chose to give the final 8 points to Katerina and the 7 points to Tania. After the combined final scores, two contestants had 13 points. The one who got the highest score from the audience got the highest final place and the one with the lowest got the lowest place.

Guest of the night was Yiannis Kapsalis.

Notes
 1.  The points that judges gave in order (Zacharatos, Papoutsaki, Maraveyas, Reppas).
 2.  Each contestant gave 5 points to a contestant of their choice.
 3.  Total of both extra and judges' score.
 4.  Result of both extra and judges' score.

Week 8: Eurovision Night
The eighth episode aired on May 9, 2021, and the winner was Betty with 23 points. Betty chose to give the money from the audience voting to the organization "Make a Wish".

After the combined final scores, two contestants had 17 points. The one who got the highest score from the audience got the highest final place and the one with the lowest got the lowest place.

Loukas Giorkas was a guest of the night, to help Lefteris with his performance. Also, Stefania, who will represent Greece in the Eurovision Song Contest 2021, was a guest and she performed live her entry, "Last Dance". Also, during Thanasis' performance, Pashalis Tsarouhas was a guest, who performed as Verka Serduchka and sang "Toy" and Ian, who performed already as Måns Zelmerlöw, sang "Fuego".

Notes
 1.  The points that judges gave in order (Zacharatos, Papoutsaki, Maraveyas, Reppas).
 2.  Each contestant gave 5 points to a contestant of their choice.
 3.  Total of both extra and judges' score.
 4.  Result of both extra and judges' score.

Week 9
The ninth episode will be aired on May 16, 2021.

Notes
 1.  The points that judges gave in order (Zacharatos, Papoutsaki, Maraveyas, Reppas).
 2.  Each contestant gave 5 points to a contestant of their choice.
 3.  Total of both extra and judges' score.
 4.  Result of both extra and judges' score.

Results chart 

 indicates the contestant came first that week.
 indicates the contestant came last that week.
 indicates the contestant that withdrew from the show.
 indicates the contestant that didn't compete.

Performances 

 indicates the contestant came first that week.
 indicates the contestant came last that week.
 indicates the contestant choose Awesome Card on buzzer.
 indicates that the contestant's performance was chosen from the audience.
 indicates the contestant that didn't compete.

Ratings

Notes and references

Notes

References

External links
 Official website of Your Face Sounds Familiar
 Facebook page of Your Face Sounds Familiar
 Twitter of Your Face Sounds Familiar

Greek 7
2021 Greek television seasons
Television productions suspended due to the COVID-19 pandemic